The Sacramento Regional Transit District, or Sacramento RT, operates a three-line urban light rail mass transit network, serving portions of greater Sacramento, California, United States. The network consists of three lines, the Blue and Gold Lines that both opened in 1987 and the Green Line that opened in 2012. The  network serves over 56,800 passengers a day as of 2012, making it the 10th-largest light rail system in the United States in terms of ridership.

The stations along the network are open-air structures featuring passenger canopies for protection from adverse weather. Twenty-six stations offer bus transfer services and eighteen have free park-and-ride lots with a total of 7,379 available parking spaces. Works of public art included at several stations were developed as part of the RT Public Art Program, and represent an array of media including, mosaics, sculptures, metalwork and murals. Each was commissioned to incorporate an identity and sense of place unique to the neighborhood surrounding the station.

Light rail service began on March 12, 1987, with the opening of 13 stations between Watt/I-80 and 8th & O. The second phase of the initial line opened on September 5, 1987, with 13 stations between Archives Plaza and Butterfield. In 1994, a pair of infill stations opened at 39th Street and 48th Street. Included originally as part of the network, both stations were deferred resulting from neighborhood opposition only to be built later due to changing attitudes towards the rail project. In 1998, Mather Field / Mills opened at Rancho Cordova as the first extension to the original network. The District opened 17 stations as part of multiple expansion projects between 2003–2007, resulting in the construction of stations in Sacramento, Rancho Cordova, Gold River and Folsom. On June 15, 2012, 7th & Richards / Township 9 opened as the first new station constructed for the Green Line. Three additional stations were opened on the Blue Line on August 24, 2015, extending the line  to Cosumnes River College; a fourth station on the extension, Morrison Creek, opened in August 2021.

Stations

Planned stations

References 

 
Sacramento Regional Transit
Sacramento Regional Transit